Rudolf Ströbinger (1931, Hage –2005) was a German journalist and writer.

1931 births
2005 deaths
German male journalists
German-language writers
German male writers
Recipients of the Cross of the Order of Merit of the Federal Republic of Germany
20th-century German journalists